Kelly Rattigan is an Australian architect and the founding managing director of Formworks Architecture.

In 2012, the Architectural Review Asia Pacific wrote a piece on her titled 'One to Watch' following the Australian Institute of Architects awarding her the National Emerging Architect Prize for excellence in design, practice, education and community involvement, and the WA 40 awarding her under40 for entrepreneurial achievement and business leadership.

Education
Rattigan completed a Bachelor of Science (Environmental Design) at the University of Western Australia in 1994 in which she had a year of experience in Studio Daniel Libeskind. She then completed a Bachelor of Architecture with Honours at RMIT University in 1998. Rattigan e studied under Peter Corrigan, whom Rattigan would later credit him as being the influence on her teaching that "any idea is a good idea," and to just "start and see where it goes".

Prior to establishing Formworks Architecture in North Fremantle, Western Australia in 2001, Rattigan spent these two years working as a Graduate Architect at Peter Elliott Architecture & Urban Design. In 2012, Rattigan was awarded the Australian Institute of Architects National Emerging Architect Prize for excellence, design, practice, education and community involvement, as well as a WA 40 under40 Award for entrepreneurial achievement and business leadership.
Upon being awarded the AIA National Emerging Architect Prize, Rattigan was recognised as having "demonstrated outstanding leadership in advocating for, and providing design for disadvantaged members of the community, particularly indigenous and rural communities, illustrating her admirable "design is for all" theoretical position. Her work for the disadvantaged, where fees and budgets are often insurmountable obstacles to the design and production of architecture, are for Kelly a challenge, rather than an impediment."
Along with her graduate studies at RMIT, Rattigan spent these two years working as a Graduate Architect at Peter Elliott Architecture & Urban Design.

Professional career

Practice 
Rattigan has worked as Project Direction and Design Director on many projects in Western Australia, endeavouring to incorporate ESD principles and initiatives into her designs with the help of grants and other extra funding.

One of Formworks' most noted works to date has been the Lime Street project for St Bartholomew's House in East Perth, Western Australia, completed in August 2012. The building is entirely devoted to housing homeless men in a safe, secure and pleasant setting, deftly taking into account the needs of clients and the various site-specific considerations, such as nearby roadways, and producing a consistently excellent response.

Rattigan's firm is one of Australia's few fully integrated Building Information Management (BIM) practices, Along with this Rattigan developed a client briefing process called 'Success by Design' to educate clients about the design process and increase their involvement in the final design outcome.

Publications 
Innovation in Practice / When, How, and Why? Australian Institute of Architect, Western Australia Chapter publication The Architect March 2009

Selected works

Built 
Aged Care and Health
 Yardinia Frail Aged Care Center
 Clayton View and Middle Swan Children and Family Centres
 St Bart's Lime Street Accommodation
 Pilbara Drug and Alcohol Rehabilitation Facility

Hospitality and Tourism
 Rottnest Campground Facilities

Community and Master Plan
 Millar's Well Dance Hall and Changing Rooms
 Kings Park Link Bridge Competition Entry
 Badge Up Community centre
 Clayton View and Middle Swan Children and Family Centres
 78 Brown Street – Multi-Generational Housing
 Gumala Indigenous Housing
 Horizon Power Offices and Depot, Esperance WA
Merredin Performing Arts Centre
 Faulkner Park
 Centre Stage-State Theatre Competition (1 or 5 shortlisted entries)
 Kalgoorlie Golf Club (competition entry)
Notable project

Lime Street stands out as a project because of the deft and varied way in which Rattigan has identified and responded to the various site and program requirements associated with the building to form a highly effective and cohesive final scheme. Designed for St Batholemew's House, a support organisation for homeless people, the building sits alongside a major highway. Dealing with the need to safely and humanely house a range of residents in different states of distress while existing in a challenging pedestrian environment, Rattigan manages to responsibly deal with a budget of $34m in creating what is widely considered one of Australia's foremost care facilities.

The building is a case of total design, with great sympathy being displayed for the situations of its potential residents, as visual cues of home and domesticity pervade the building, private rooftop gardens offer comfortable views both towards and away from the apartment blocks, as well as a chance for residents to express themselves.

Recognition and awards
 2011 – WA Business News 40 under 40 for Entrepreneurial Achievement and Business Leadership
 2011 – AIA Emerging Architect Award – Western Australia
 2011 – Attended by CHOGM Delegates Tour
 2012 – AIA National Emerging Architect Prize
 2013 – AIA WA Chapter – Harold Krantz Award for Residential Architecture – Multiple Housing
 2013 – Urban Development Institute of Australia – President's Award, WA Chapter
 2013 – Urban Development Institute of Australia – Sustainable Urban Development Award, WA Chapter
 2016 – World Cities Summit, 10–14 July 2016
 Named in Public Interest Design Global 100 as a person who has influenced public design worldwide Rattigan. Alongside Bill and Melinda Gates, His Royal Highness the Prince of Wales, and Shigeru Ban.

References

External links
Formworks.com.au
Australiandesignreview.com
Raia.com

Year of birth missing (living people)
Living people
Australian women architects
21st-century Australian architects
20th-century Australian architects
20th-century Australian women
21st-century Australian women